Dilyara Saidkhodjayeva (born 29 January 1990) is an Uzbekistani former professional tennis player.

Saidkhodjayeva has career-high WTA rankings of 886 in singles, achieved on 16 July 2007, and 664 in doubles, set on 7 July 2008. Saidkhodjayeva retirement from professional tennis in 2010.

Her only WTA Tour main-draw appearance came at the Tashkent Open where she partnered Albina Khabibulina in the doubles event. They lost in the quarterfinals to Italian Maria Elena Camerin and  Swiss Emmanuelle Gagliardi.

Playing for Uzbekistan at the Fed Cup, Saidkhodjayeva has a win–loss record of 10–1.

ITF Circuit finals

Doubles: 1 (0–1)

Fed Cup participation

Singles (4–1)

Doubles (6–0)

ITF junior results

Singles (5–3)

Doubles (3–4)

References

External links 

 
 

1990 births
Living people
Sportspeople from Tashkent
Uzbekistani female tennis players
Asian Games medalists in tennis
Tennis players at the 2006 Asian Games
Asian Games bronze medalists for Uzbekistan
Medalists at the 2006 Asian Games
21st-century Uzbekistani women